Statistics of Portuguese Liga in the 1945–46 season.

Overview

It was contested by 12 teams, and C.F. Os Belenenses won the championship, the first time that the competition had been won by a team outside the Portuguese "Big Three" (Os Três Grandes) of Benfica, Porto and Sporting.

League standings

Results

References

Primeira Liga seasons
1945–46 in Portuguese football
Portugal